Antoine Gérin-Lajoie (August 4, 1824 – August 7, 1882) was a Québécois Canadian attorney, poet and novelist.

He was the author of the famous poem "Un Canadien errant" ('A Wandering Canadian'), as well as the novels roman du terroir Jean Rivard, le défricheur (1874) and its sequel, Jean Rivard, économiste (1876), among other works. He was the father of sociologist Léon Gérin.

Early life and education
Antoine Gérin-Lajoie was the eldest child of Antoine Gérin-Lajoie, Sr., and Marie-Amable Gélinas, who had seventeen children in all, of which ten survived childhood. His family hailed from Savoie, France, and arrived in Canada when his grandfather Jean served in the army of Louis-Joseph de Montcalm. In 1844, he travelled to Montreal to study law, and was admitted to the Bar of Lower Canada in 1848.

Career
He wrote "Un Canadien errant" in 1842 while taking his classical exams at the Séminaire de Nicolet. During his legal studies, he lived in poverty and worked for the newspaper La Minerve as a translator and corrector and later as an editor. He also served as the secretary of the Saint-Jean-Baptiste Society from 1845 until its reorganization in 1847. In 1849, he worked for the Ministry of Public Works and was named to the Library of Parliament in 1856, living alternately between Montreal and Toronto. In 1860 he moved to Quebec City when the government settled there, and became one of the founders of the literature magazines Les Soirées canadiennes and later Le Foyer canadien. His roman du terroir Jean Rivard, le défricheur appeared in the former magazine in 1862, and its sequel, Jean Rivard, économiste appeared in the latter magazine in 1864. In 1867, when the government moved to Ottawa, he moved there too where he continued to work as a librarian for the federal library. After getting struck with paralysis in 1880, he died two years later at the age of 58.

References

External links
 
 Biography at the Dictionary of Canadian Biography Online
 Archives of the Gerin-Lajoie family, including records concerning Antoine Gérin-Lajoie (Fonds famille Gérin-Lajoie, R11755), are held at Library and Archives Canada
 Jean Rivard : scènes de la vie réelle on Bibliothèque mobile de littérature québécoise (HTML)

Antoine Gerin-Lajoie
1824 births
1882 deaths
19th-century Canadian lawyers
19th-century Canadian male writers
19th-century Canadian poets
Canadian male poets
Canadian poets in French
Lawyers in Quebec
Persons of National Historic Significance (Canada)
Writers from Quebec